Divya S. Menon is an Indian musician and television anchor from Kerala. Divya is a playback singer in Malayalam cinema, who has also recorded songs for Tamil and Telugu films. Divya started anchoring musical shows in Asianet Cable Vision (Thrissur) and has done musical shows in Yes Indiavision (Mementos) and Kairali Channels (Ganamela, Sing 'N' Win and Rain drops).

Personal life

Divya was born in Thrissur, Kerala, to Soman Kurup, a mechanical engineer and his wife Meena Soman. She was introduced to the world of music as a child and started singing at an early age of seven. Divya's father was on a transferable job and hence she attended schools including Kendriya Vidyalaya and Bhavans Vidhya Mandir across India. She graduated with a bachelor's degree in Commerce from Sree Kerala Varma College, Thrissur and went on to pursue her master's degree in Fashion Designing from St. Teresa's College, Ernakulam. She is married to Reghu Mohan on 20 August 2012 and is currently residing at Thrippunithura, Kochi, Kerala. The couple has a baby girl born on 31 October 2014.

Career

Divya was trained in Carnatic Music from the age of 12 years by Smt. Shakunthala Sheshadri, Mr. Sunil and Sri. Mangad Nadessan.Divya also received education in Hindustani Classical music from Ustad Fiyaz Khan and Sri Dinesh Devdas. She is also passionate about jewellery making and has conducted several exhibitions under her jewellery brand named "Jingles".

Divya S Menon started her film career by singing for the 2009 film Ee Pattanathil Bhootham. She was noticed by Shaan Rahman while anchoring music shows and picked her for Vineeth Sreenivasan – Shaan Rahman debut album, Coffee @ MG Road. She is associated with Blogswara and have sung in multiple albums in the series. Divya has sung in Vineeth Sreenivasan's super hit romantic movie, Thattathin Marayathu composed by Shaan Rahman. She has been associated with Vineeth – Shaan ventures, including Malarvadi Arts Club. In 2014 the hit wedding song "Thudakkham Maangalyam" from Anjali Menon's Bangalore Days gave her much popularity which she sang along with Vijay Yesudas and Sachin Warrier composed by Gopi Sunder. In 2015 Divya was noticed more promptly when she sang the song "Puthumazhayai" from Martin Prakkat's Charlie composed by Gopi Sundar while the same song was sung by Shreya Ghoshal too. She also sang several ad jingles for various music composers both in Malayalam and Tamil.

Discography

Awards

Albums

References

Living people
Malayalam playback singers
Indian women television presenters
Indian television presenters
Indian women playback singers
Kendriya Vidyalaya alumni
Bharatiya Vidya Bhavan schools alumni
Singers from Thrissur
Film musicians from Kerala
Telugu playback singers
Tamil playback singers
Television personalities from Kerala
Women musicians from Kerala
21st-century Indian singers
21st-century Indian women singers
1987 births